This is Your Life, Harriet Chance! is a book by Jonathan Evison released in September 2015. The book is about a widow struggling to come to terms with her husband's death.

References 

2015 American novels
Algonquin Books books